Parkview station is a SEPTA rapid transit located in the Highland Park section of Upper Darby, Pennsylvania. It serves the Norristown High Speed Line (Route 100) and is located along Parkview Road and Pennock Road although SEPTA gives the address as Fairview Avenue and Parkview Road. Only local trains stop at Parkview.

External links

 Parkview Road entrance from Google Maps Street View

SEPTA Norristown High Speed Line stations